Yi Sun-sin may also refer to:

Yi Sun-sin (1545–1598), also known as Chungmugong, a Korean commander
ROKS Chungmugong Yi Sun-sin (DDH-975), a Chungmugong Yi Sun-sin-class destroyer
Yi Sun-sin (1554–1611), also known as Muuigong, a Korean commander
ROKS Yi Sun-sin (SS-068), a Chang Bogo-class submarine

See also
Yi Sun-sin Bridge
Yi Sun-sin Stadium